German submarine U-639 was a Type VIIC U-boat built for Nazi Germany's Kriegsmarine for service during World War II. She was laid down on 31 October 1941 at Blohm & Voss in Hamburg as yard number 615, launched on 22 July 1942 and went into service on 10 September 1942. U-639 spent her entire career operating out of Norway.

Design
German Type VIIC submarines were preceded by the shorter Type VIIB submarines. U-639 had a displacement of  when at the surface and  while submerged. She had two shafts and two  propellers.

U-639 was fitted with five  torpedo tubes (four fitted at the bow and one at the stern), fourteen torpedoes, one  SK C/35 naval gun, 220 rounds, and one twin  C/30 anti-aircraft gun. The boat had a complement of between forty-four and sixty.

References

Bibliography

External links

1942 ships
German Type VIIC submarines
Ships built in Hamburg
U-boats commissioned in 1942
U-boats sunk in 1943
U-boats sunk by Soviet submarines
World War II shipwrecks in the Arctic Ocean
World War II submarines of Germany
Maritime incidents in August 1943